Hennef (Sieg) station is located on the Sieg Railway in the town of Hennef (Sieg) in the German state of North Rhine-Westphalia. It was opened in 1859 for passenger and freight traffic by the Cologne-Minden Railway Company along with the Sieg Railway.

Station building 

The listed building station building was opened in 1859 by the Cologne-Minden Railway Company and has been privately owned since 2004. The station has a Deutsche Bahn ticket counter, a bar and a fast food restaurant. Next to the station there is a parking garage.

Platforms 
The station has a side and a central platform serviced by three tracks for passenger trains. They have lifts and are free of barriers for the disabled. The disused track four has no platform.

Train services
The station is served by the Rhein-Sieg-Express (RE 9) every hour. In the morning peak hour two extra RE 9 services run to Cologne and in the afternoon peak hour two extra RE 9 services run to Siegen. It is also served by Rhine-Ruhr S-Bahn service S12 every twenty or forty minutes towards Köln-Ehrenfeld (Horrem in the peak) and every hour towards Au (Sieg) and the S19 service between Düren and Herchen or Au (Sieg) hourly. The S12 and S19 services provide a service every 20 minutes on weekdays. On the weekend, the S12 operates every 30 minutes between Köln-Ehrenfeld and Au (Sieg) and the S19 operates hourly between Düren and Hennef, providing three services an hour on the weekend towards Cologne. Freight trains rarely operate through the station. All passenger trains running through the station are operated by DB Regio Rheinland. The station is classified by Deutsche Bahn since January 2011 as a category 4 station.

Notes

Railway stations in North Rhine-Westphalia
Rhine-Ruhr S-Bahn stations
S12 (Rhine-Ruhr S-Bahn)
Railway stations in Germany opened in 1859
Buildings and structures in Rhein-Sieg-Kreis